NGC 2355 is an old open cluster in the constellation Gemini.

It is approximately a billion years old and is located about 5,400 light years (ly) from the Solar System and 1,100 ly above the plane of the Milky Way galaxy. At that distance, the angular size of the cluster halo corresponds to a radius of about 23 ly. The core radius is 2.3 ly, and the central component radius is 11 ly.

References

External links
 

Open clusters
Gemini (constellation)
2355